Stuart McGugan (born 2 March 1944) is a Scottish actor.

He played the roles of Gunner 'Atlas' Mackintosh in the BBC sitcom It Ain't Half Hot Mum and Bomba MacAteer in Tutti Frutti. McGugan was a presenter on BBC's Play School from 1975; he regularly presented the programme for more than 10 years. 

McGugan appeared as Gordon Stewart in two series of the London Weekend Television (LWT) series Wish Me Luck between 1988 and 1989, in The Chief as Chief Superintendent Sean McCloud from 1993 to 1994, then in the mid-1990s was the pub owner Barney Meldrum in BBC Scotland's Hamish MacBeth. He had a recurring role as a factory worker in the Perry/Croft sitcom You Rang M'Lord?. In Family Affairs in 1997 he played the character Derek Simpson. He has been seen in a Middle Ground Theatre Company tour of a stage adaptation of the 1960 film Tunes of Glory. Stuart McGugan played Colonel Jock Sinclair, originally played by Alec Guinness in the film. The production visited Jersey, Wolverhampton and Perth, Scotland in early 2007. He also appeared in an episode of Dad's Army, playing a soldier, he played Bruce Burns in the episode 'The Last Stop' of the Thames Television series The Bill, Sgt June Ackland's last day and in an episode of ITV's Comedy series Benidorm in November 2009 playing a character called Wink McAndrew.

Partial filmography

References

External links 
 

1944 births
Living people
20th-century Scottish male actors
21st-century Scottish male actors
BBC television presenters
People educated at Forfar Academy
People from Stirling
Scottish male stage actors
Scottish male television actors